A testbed aircraft is an aeroplane, helicopter or other kind of aircraft intended for flight research or testing the aircraft concepts or on-board equipment. These could be specially designed or modified from serial production aircraft.

Use of testbed aircraft

For example, in development of new aircraft engines, these are fitted to a testbed aircraft for flight testing, before certification. For this adaptation  new instrumentation wiring and equipment, fuel system and piping, structural modifications of the wings, and other changes are required.

The Folland Fo.108 (nicknamed the "Folland Frightful") was a dedicated engine testbed aircraft in service from 1940. The aircraft had a mid-fuselage cabin for test instrumentation and observers. Twelve were built and provided to British aero-engine companies. A large number of aircraft-testbeds have been produced and tested since 1941 in the USSR and Russia by the Gromov Flight Research Institute.

AlliedSignal, Honeywell Aerospace, Pratt & Whitney, and other aerospace companies used Boeing jetliners as flying testbed aircraft.

See also

 List of experimental aircraft
 List of aerospace flight test centres
 Development mule
 Iron bird (aviation)

References

Aerospace engineering
Experimental aircraft
Aviation industry
Civil aviation
Military aviation
Aircraft operations
History of aviation